Marina Massironi (born 16 May 1963) is an Italian actress. She appeared in more than twenty films since 1987.

Selected filmography

Awards
 David di Donatello for Best Supporting Actress for her performance in Bread and Tulips (2000)

External links 
 

1963 births
Living people
People from Legnano
Italian film actresses
David di Donatello winners
Nastro d'Argento winners
20th-century Italian actresses
21st-century Italian actresses